Valley Of A Thousand Falls is a valley located in the Cariboo region of British Columbia.  The valley is located between Berg Lake and Kinney Lake in Mount Robson Provincial Park.

References

Valleys of British Columbia